The 2011 Safeway Championship (Manitoba men's provincial curling championship) was held February 9–13, 2011 at the Sun Gro Centre in Beausejour. The winning team of Jeff Stoughton would represent Manitoba at the 2011 Tim Hortons Brier in London, Ontario.

Teams
Thirty-two teams qualify for the men's provincial championship in Manitoba. Berths 1–14 represent the rural zones, berths 15–21 represent the Winnipeg zones. There are two separate bonspiels played earlier in the year representing the north and south called the Northern and Southern Bonspiels; these represent berths 22 and 23. Berth 24 is the winner of the Brandon Bonspiel played around the same time of fall as the Northern and Southern floating bonspiels. Number 25 is the prior Manitoba Champion assuming the team meets the requirements to represent themselves. The same goes for berths 26 and 27, which are the Manitoba Curling Tour champion and top Manitoba team on the Canadian Team Ranking System respectively, number 27 must be declared by November 1, 2010. Numbers 28–32 are qualifiers from the MCA Bonspiel, also subject to subset rules and requirements.

Once all 32 teams have been qualified, they will be seeded respectively and slotted into the draw format of 1 vs 32, 2 vs 31, and so on.

Draw Brackets
32 team double knockout with playoff round
Four teams qualify each from A Event and B Event

A Event

B Event

Results
All times CST

Draw 1
February 9, 8:30 am

Draw 2
February 9, 12:15 pm

Draw 3
February 9, 4:00 pm

Draw 4
February 9, 8:15 pm

Draw 5
February 10, 8:30 am

Draw 6
February 10, 12:15 pm

Draw 7
February 10, 4:00 pm

Draw 8
February 10, 7:45 pm

Draw 9
February 11, 8:30 am

Draw 10
February 11, 12:15 pm

Draw 11
February 11, 4:00 pm

Playoffs

Playoff round
8 team double knockout
Four teams qualify into Championship Round

First round
February 11, 7:45 pm

Second round
February 12, 8:30 am

Third round
February 12, 1:30 pm

Championship Round

1 vs. 2
February 12, 6:30 pm

3 vs. 4
February 12, 6:30 pm

Semifinal
February 13, 9:00 am

Final
February 13, 1:30 pm

Awards
All-Star Team
 Skip – Terry McNamee, Team McNamee
 Third – Vic Peters, Team Peters
 Second – Reid Carruthers, Team Stoughton
 Lead – Steve Gould, Team Stoughton

External links
 Beausejour 2011 official site
 Beausejour Curling Club
 Safeway Championship site

References

Safeway Championship, 2011
Curling in Manitoba
2011 in Manitoba
February 2011 sports events in Canada